New Netherland (or ) was a 17th-century colonial province of the Dutch Republic located on the east coast of what is now the United States. The claimed territories extended from the Delmarva Peninsula to southwestern Cape Cod, while limited settlements were in parts of the U.S. states of New York, New Jersey, Delaware, Massachusetts and Connecticut, with small outposts in Pennsylvania and Rhode Island.

Amid the Netherlands' emergence as a major maritime and commercial power, the colony was conceived by the Dutch West India Company (GWC) in 1621 to capitalize on the North American fur trade. Settlement initially stalled because of policy mismanagement by the GWC, and conflicts with Native Americans. The settlement of New Sweden by the Swedish South Company encroached on its southern flank, while its eastern border was redrawn to accommodate an expanding New England Confederation.

The colony experienced dramatic growth during the 1650s, and became a major port for trade in the north Atlantic Ocean. The Dutch surrendered Fort Amsterdam on Manhattan island to England in 1664 (formalized in 1667), during the Second Anglo-Dutch War. In 1673, the Dutch retook the area but relinquished it under the Treaty of Westminster (1674) that ended the Third Anglo-Dutch War the next year.

The inhabitants of New Netherland were European colonists, Native Americans, and Africans imported as slave laborers. Not including Native Americans, the colonial population, many of whom were not of Dutch descent, was 1,500 to 2,000 in 1650, and 8,000 to 9,000 at the time of transfer to England in 1674.

Origin

During the 17th century, Europe was undergoing expansive social, cultural, and economic growth, known as the Dutch Golden Age in the Netherlands. Nations vied for domination of lucrative trade routes around the globe, particularly those to Asia. Simultaneously, philosophical and theological conflicts were manifested in military battles throughout the European continent. The Dutch Republic had become a home to many intellectuals, international businessmen, and religious refugees. In the Americas, the English had a settlement at Jamestown, Virginia, the French had small settlements at Port Royal and Quebec, and the Spanish were developing colonies in South America and the Caribbean.

In 1609, English sea captain and explorer Henry Hudson was hired by the Dutch East India Company (VOC) to find a Northeast Passage to Asia, sailing around Scandinavia and Russia. He was turned back by the ice of the Arctic in his second attempt, so he sailed west to seek a Northwest Passage rather than return home. He ended up exploring the waters off the northeast coast of North America aboard the Flyboat Halve Maen. His first landfall was at Newfoundland and the second at Cape Cod.

Hudson believed that the passage to the Pacific Ocean was between the St. Lawrence River and Chesapeake Bay, so he sailed south to the Bay, then turned northward, traveling close along the shore. From Delaware Bay, he began to sail upriver looking for the passage. This effort was foiled by sandy shoals, and the Halve Maen continued north along the coast. After passing Sandy Hook, Hudson and his crew entered the Narrows into the Upper New York Bay. Hudson believed that he had found the continental water route, so he sailed up the major river that now bears his name. He found the water too shallow to proceed several days later at the site of Troy, New York.

Upon returning to the Netherlands, Hudson reported that he had found a fertile land and an amicable people willing to engage his crew in small-scale bartering of furs, trinkets, clothes, and small manufactured goods. His report was first published in 1611 by Emanuel Van Meteren, the Dutch Consul at London. This stimulated interest in exploiting this new trade resource, and it was the catalyst for Dutch merchant-traders to fund more expeditions. Merchants such as Arnout Vogels sent the first follow-up voyages to exploit this discovery as early as July 1610.

In 1611–1612, the Admiralty of Amsterdam sent two covert expeditions to find a passage to China with the yachts Craen and Vos, captained by Jan Cornelisz Mey and Symon Willemsz Cat respectively. Adriaen Block, Hendrick Christiaensen, and Cornelius Jacobsen Mey explored, surveyed, and mapped the area between Maryland and Massachusetts in four voyages made between 1611 and 1614. These surveys and charts were consolidated in Block's map, which used the name New Netherland for the first time; it was also called Nova Belgica on maps. During this period, there was some trading with the Native American population.

Fur trader Juan Rodriguez was born in Santo Domingo of Portuguese and African descent. He arrived in Manhattan during the winter of 1613–1614, trapping for pelts and trading with the Indians as a representative of the Dutch. He was the first recorded non-native inhabitant of New York City.

Development

Chartered trading companies

The immediate and intense competition among Dutch trading companies in the newly charted areas led to disputes in Amsterdam and calls for regulation. The States General was the governing body of the Republic of the Seven United Netherlands, and it proclaimed on 17 March 1614, that it would grant an exclusive patent for trade between the 40th and 45th parallels. This monopoly would be valid for four voyages, and all four voyages had to be undertaken within three years of the award. The New Netherland Company was an alliance of trading companies, and they used Adrian Block's map to win a patent that expired on 1 January 1618.

The New Netherland Company also ordered a survey of the Delaware Valley, and Cornelis Hendricksz of Monnickendam explored the Zuyd Rivier (South River) in 1616 from its bay to its northernmost navigable reaches. His observations were preserved in a map drawn in 1616. Hendricksz made his voyages aboard the IJseren Vercken (Iron Hog), a vessel built in America. Despite the survey, the company was unable to secure an exclusive patent from the States General for the area between the 38th and 40th parallels.

The States General issued patents in 1614 for the development of New Netherland as a private, commercial venture. Soon after, traders built Fort Nassau on Castle Island in the area of Albany up Hudson's river. The fort was to defend river traffic against interlopers and to conduct fur trading operations with the Indians. The location of the fort proved to be impractical, however, due to repeated flooding of the island in the summers, and it was abandoned in 1618 when the patent expired.

The Republic of the Seven United Netherlands granted a charter to the Dutch West India Company (GWC) (Geoctroyeerde Westindische Compagnie) on 3 June 1621, which gave the company the exclusive right to operate in West Africa (between the Tropic of Cancer and the Cape of Good Hope) and the Americas.

Willem Usselincx was one of the founders of the GWC, and he promoted the concept that a main goal of the company should be to establish colonies in the New World. In 1620, Usselincx made a last appeal to the States General, which rejected his principal vision as a primary goal. The legislators preferred the formula of trading posts with small populations and a military presence to protect them, which was working in the East Indies, versus encouraging mass immigration and establishing large colonies. The company did not focus on colonization in America until 1654, when it was forced to surrender Dutch Brazil and forfeit the richest sugar-producing area in the world.

Pre-colonial population

The first trading partners of the New Netherlanders were the Algonquins who lived in the area. The Dutch depended on the native nations to capture, skin, and deliver pelts to them, especially beaver. It is likely that Hudson's peaceful contact with the Mahicans encouraged them to establish Fort Nassau in 1614, the first of many garrisoned trading stations. In 1628, the Mohawks (members of the Iroquois Confederacy) conquered the Mahicans, who retreated to Connecticut. The Mohawks gained a near-monopoly in the fur trade with the Dutch, as they controlled the upstate Adirondacks and Mohawk Valley through the center of New York.

The Algonquin Lenape population around New York Bay and along the lower Hudson River were seasonally migrational people. The Dutch called the numerous band collectively the River Indians, known the exonyms associated with place names as the Wecquaesgeek, Hackensacks, Raritans, Canarsee, and Tappans. These groups had the most frequent contact with the New Netherlanders. The Munsee inhabited the Highlands, Hudson Valley, and northern New Jersey, while the Susquehannocks lived west of the Delaware River along the Susquehanna River, which the Dutch regarded as their boundary with Virginia.

Company policy required land to be purchased from the Indians. The Dutch West India Company would offer a land patent, and the recipient would be responsible for negotiating a deal with representatives of the local tribes, usually the sachem or high chief. The Indians referred to the Dutch colonists as Swannekins, or salt water people; they had vastly different conceptions of ownership and use of land than the colonists did, and difficulties sometimes arose concerning the expectations on both sides. The colonists thought that their proffer of gifts in the form of sewant or manufactured goods was a trade agreement and defense alliance, which gave them exclusive rights to farming, hunting, and fishing. Often, the Indians did not vacate the property, or reappeared seasonally according to their migration patterns. They were willing to share the land with the colonists, but the Indians did not intend to leave or give up access. This misunderstanding and other differences led to violent conflict later. At the same time, such differences marked the beginnings of a multicultural society.

Early settlement

Like the French in the north, the Dutch focused their interest on the fur trade. To that end, they cultivated contingent relations with the Five Nations of the Iroquois to procure greater access to key central regions from which the skins came.

The Dutch encouraged a kind of feudal aristocracy over time, to attract settlers to the region of the Hudson River, in what became known as the system of the Charter of Freedoms and Exemptions. Further south, a Swedish trading company that had ties with the Dutch tried to establish its first settlement along the Delaware River three years later. Without resources to consolidate its position, New Sweden was gradually absorbed by New Holland and later in Pennsylvania and Delaware.

The earliest Dutch settlement was built around 1613, and consisted of a number of small huts built by the crew of the "Tijger" (Tiger), a Dutch ship under the command of Captain Adriaen Block, which had caught fire while sailing on the Hudson. Soon after, the first of two Fort Nassaus was built, and small factorijen or trading posts went up, where  commerce could be conducted with the Algonquian and Iroquois population, possibly at Schenectady, Esopus, Quinnipiac, Communipaw, and elsewhere.

In 1617, Dutch colonists built a fort at the confluence of the Hudson and Mohawk Rivers where Albany now stands. In 1624, New Netherland became a province of the Dutch Republic, which had lowered the northern border of its North American dominion to 42 degrees latitude in acknowledgment of the claim by the English north of Cape Cod. The Dutch named the three main rivers of the province the Zuyd Rivier (South River), the Noort Rivier (North River), and the Versche Rivier (Fresh River). Discovery, charting, and permanent settlement were needed to maintain a territorial claim. To this end in May 1624, the GWC landed 30 families at Fort Orange and Noten Eylant (today's Governors Island) at the mouth of the North River. They disembarked from the ship New Netherland, under the command of Cornelis Jacobsz May, the first Director of the New Netherland. He was replaced the following year by Willem Verhulst.

In June 1625, 45 additional colonists disembarked on Noten Eylant from three ships named Horse, Cow, and Sheep, which also delivered 103 horses, steers, cows, pigs, and sheep. Most settlers were dispersed to the various garrisons built across the territory: upstream to Fort Orange, to Kievits Hoek on the Fresh River, and Fort Wilhelmus on the South River. Many of the settlers were not Dutch but Walloons, French Huguenots, or Africans (most as enslaved labor, some later gaining "half-free" status).

North River and The Manhattans

Peter Minuit became Director of the New Netherland in 1626 and made a decision that greatly affected the new colony. Originally, the capital of the province was to be located on the South River, but it was soon realized that the location was susceptible to mosquito infestation in the summer and the freezing of its waterways in the winter. He chose instead the island of Manhattan at the mouth of the river explored by Hudson, at that time called the North River.

Minuit traded some goods with the local population, and reported that he had purchased it from the natives, as was company policy. He ordered the construction of Fort Amsterdam at its southern tip, around which grew the heart of the province called The Manhattoes in the vernacular of the day, rather than New Netherland.

The port city of New Amsterdam outside the walls of the fort became a major hub for trade between North America, the Caribbean, and Europe, and the place where raw materials were loaded, such as pelts, lumber, and tobacco. Sanctioned privateering contributed to its growth. It was given its municipal charter in 1653, by which time the Commonality of New Amsterdam included the isle of Manhattan, Staaten Eylandt, Pavonia, and the Lange Eylandt towns.

In the hope of encouraging immigration, the Dutch West India Company established the Charter of Freedoms and Exemptions in 1629, which gave it the power to offer vast land grants and the title of patroon to some of its invested members. The vast tracts were called patroonships, and the title came with powerful manorial rights and privileges, such as the creation of civil and criminal courts and the appointing of local officials. In return, a patroon was required by the Company to establish a settlement of at least 50 families within four years who would live as tenant farmers. Of the original five patents given, the largest and only truly successful endeavour was Rensselaerswyck, at the highest navigable point on the North River, which became the main thoroughfare of the province. Beverwijck grew from a trading post to a bustling, independent town in the midst of Rensselaerwyck, as did Wiltwyck, south of the patroonship in Esopus country.

Kieft's War

Willem Kieft was Director of New Netherland from 1638 until 1647. The colony had grown somewhat before his arrival, reaching 8,000 population in 1635. Yet it did not flourish, and Kieft was under pressure to cut costs. At this time, Indian tribes which had signed mutual defense treaties with the Dutch were gathering near the colony due to widespread warfare and dislocation among the tribes to the north. At first, he suggested collecting tribute from the Indians, as was common among the various dominant tribes, but his demands were simply ignored by the Tappan and Wecquaesgeek. Subsequently, a colonist was murdered in an act of revenge for some killings that had taken place years earlier and the Indians refused to turn over the perpetrator. Kieft suggested that they be taught a lesson by ransacking their villages. In an attempt to gain public support, he created the citizens commission the Council of Twelve Men.

The Council did not rubber-stamp his ideas, as he had expected them to, but took the opportunity to mention grievances that they had with the company's mismanagement and its unresponsiveness to their suggestions. Kieft thanked and disbanded them and, against their advice, ordered that groups of Tappan and Wecquaesgeek be attacked at Pavonia and Corlear's Hook, even though they had sought refuge from their more powerful Mohican enemies per their treaty understandings with the Dutch. The massacre left 130 dead. Within days, the surrounding tribes united and rampaged the countryside, in a unique move, forcing settlers who escaped to find safety at Fort Amsterdam. For two years, a series of raids and reprisals raged across the province, until 1645 when Kieft's War ended with a treaty, in a large part brokered by the Hackensack sagamore Oratam.

The colonists were disenchanted with Kieft, his ignorance of indigenous peoples, and the unresponsiveness of the GWC to their rights and requests, and they submitted the Remonstrance of New Netherland to the States General. This document was written by Leiden-educated New Netherland lawyer Adriaen van der Donck, condemning the GWC for mismanagement and demanding full rights as citizens of the province of the Netherlands.

Director-General Stuyvesant

Peter Stuyvesant arrived in New Amsterdam in 1647, the only governor of the colony to be called Director-General.
Some years earlier land ownership policy was liberalized and trading was somewhat deregulated, and many New Netherlanders considered themselves entrepreneurs in a free market. The population had reached about 15,000, including 500 on Manhattan Island.

During the period of his governorship, the province experienced exponential growth. Demands were made upon Stuyvesant from all sides: the GWC, the States General, and the New Netherlanders. Dutch territory was being nibbled at by the English to the north and the Swedes to the south, while in the heart of the province the Esopus were trying to contain further Dutch expansion. Discontent in New Amsterdam led locals to dispatch Adriaen van der Donck back to the United Provinces to seek redress. After nearly three years of legal and political wrangling, the Dutch Government came down against the GWC, granting the colony a measure of self-government and recalling Stuyvesant in April 1652. However, the orders were rescinded with the outbreak of the First Anglo-Dutch War a month later.  Military battles were occurring in the Caribbean and along the South Atlantic coast. In 1654, the Netherlands lost New Holland in Brazil to Portugal, encouraging some of its residents to emigrate north and making the North American colonies more appealing to some investors. The Esopus Wars are so named for the branch of Lenape that lived around Wiltwijck, today's Kingston, which was the Dutch settlement on the west bank of Hudson River between Beverwyk and New Amsterdam. These conflicts were generally over settlement of land by New Netherlanders for which contracts had not been clarified, and were seen by the natives as an unwanted incursion into their territory. Previously, the Esopus, a clan of the Munsee Lenape, had much less contact with the River Indians and the Mohawks.
According to historian Eleanor Bruchey:
Peter Stuyvesant was essentially a difficult man thrust into a difficult position. Quick tempered, self-confident, and authoritarian, he was determined...to rule firmly and to repair the fortunes of the company. The company, however, had run the colony solely for trade profits, with scant attention to encouraging immigration and developing local government. Stuyvesant's predecessors...had been dishonest or, at best, inept, so there was no tradition of respect and support for the governorship on which he could build. Furthermore, the colonists were vocal and quick to challenge authority....Throughout his administration there were constant complaints to the company of his tyrannical acts and pressure for more local self-government....His religious intolerance also exacerbated relations with the colonists, most of whom did not share his narrow outlook.

Society

New Netherlanders were not necessarily Dutch, and New Netherland was never a homogeneous society. Governor Peter Minuit was a Walloon born in Germany who spoke English and worked for a Dutch company. The term New Netherland Dutch generally includes all the Europeans who came to live there, but may also refer to Africans, Indo-Caribbeans, South Americans, and even the Indians who were integral to the society. Dutch was the official language and likely the lingua franca of the province, although other languages were also spoken. There were various Algonquian languages; Walloons and Huguenots tended to speak French, and Scandinavians and Germans brought their own tongues. It is likely that the Africans on Manhattan spoke their mother tongues but were taught Dutch from 1638 by Adam Roelantsz van Dokkum. The arrival of refugees from New Holland in Brazil may have brought speakers of Portuguese, Spanish, and Ladino (with Hebrew as a liturgical language). Commercial activity in the harbor could have been transacted simultaneously in any of a number of tongues.

The Dutch West India Company introduced slavery in 1625 with the importation of 11 black slaves who worked as farmers, fur traders, and builders. They had a few basic rights and families were usually kept intact. They were admitted to the Dutch Reformed Church and married by its ministers, and their children could be baptized. Slaves could testify in court, sign legal documents, and bring civil actions against whites. Some were permitted to work after hours earning wages equal to those paid to white workers. When the colony fell, the company freed the slaves, establishing early on a nucleus of free blacks.

The Union of Utrecht is the founding document of the Dutch Republic, signed in 1579, and it stated "that everyone shall remain free in religion and that no one may be persecuted or investigated because of religion". The Dutch West India Company, however, established the Reformed Church as the official religious institution of New Netherland. Its successor church is the Reformed Church in America. The colonists had to attract the Indians and other non-believers to God's word, "through attitude and by example" but not "to persecute someone by reason of his religion, and to leave everyone the freedom of his conscience", In addition, the laws and ordinances of the states of Holland were incorporated by reference in those first instructions to the Governors Island settlers in 1624. There were two test cases during Stuyvesant's governorship in which the rule prevailed: the official granting of full residency for both Ashkenazi and Sephardi Jews in New Amsterdam in 1655, and the Flushing Remonstrance involving Quakers in
1657.
It was located in areas of Canada all the way to Delaware

Expansion and incursion

South River and New Sweden
Apart from the second Fort Nassau, and the small community that supported it, settlement along the Zuyd Rivier was limited. An attempt by patroons of Zwaanendael, Samuel Blommaert and Samuel Godijn was destroyed by the local population soon after its founding in 1631 during the absence of their agent, David Pietersen de Vries.

Peter Minuit, who had construed a deed for Manhattan (and was soon after dismissed as director), knew that the Dutch would be unable to defend the southern flank of their North American territory and had not signed treaties with or purchased land from the Minquas. After gaining the support from the Queen of Sweden, he chose the southern banks of the Delaware Bay to establish a colony there, which he did in 1638, calling it Fort Christina, New Sweden. As expected, the government at New Amsterdam took no other action than to protest. Other settlements sprang up as colony grew, mostly populated by Swedes, Finns, Germans, and Dutch. In 1651, Fort Nassau was dismantled and relocated in an attempt to disrupt trade and reassert control, receiving the name Fort Casimir. Fort Beversreede was built in the same year, but was short-lived. In 1655, Stuyvesant led a military expedition and regained control of the region, calling its main town "New Amstel" (Nieuw-Amstel). During this expedition, some villages and plantations at the Manhattans (Pavonia and Staten Island) were attacked in an incident that is known as the Peach Tree War. These raids are sometimes considered revenge for the murder of an Indian girl attempting to pluck a peach, though it was likely that they were a retaliation for the attacks at New Sweden.
A new experimental settlement was begun in 1673, just before the British takeover in 1674. Franciscus van den Enden had drawn up charter for a utopian society that included equal education of all classes, joint ownership of property, and a democratically elected government. Pieter Corneliszoon Plockhoy attempted such a settlement near the site of Zwaanendael, but it soon expired under English rule.

Fresh River and New England

Few Dutch settlers to New Netherland made their home at Fort Goede Hoop on the Fresh River. As early as 1637, English settlers from the Massachusetts Bay Colony began to settle along its banks and on Lange Eylandt, some with permission from the colonial government and others with complete disregard for it. The English colonies grew more rapidly than New Netherland as they were motivated by a desire to establish communities with religious roots, rather than for trade purposes. The wal or rampart was originally built at Wall Street due to fear of an invasion by the English.

Initially, there was limited contact between New Englanders and New Netherlanders, but the two provinces engaged in direct diplomatic relations with a swelling English population and territorial disputes. The New England Confederation was formed in 1643 as a political and military alliance of the English colonies of Massachusetts, Plymouth, Connecticut, and New Haven. Connecticut and New Haven were actually on land claimed by the United Provinces, but the Dutch were unable to populate or militarily defend their territorial claim and therefore could do nothing but protest the growing flood of English settlers. With the 1650 Treaty of Hartford, Stuyvesant provisionally ceded the Connecticut River region to New England, drawing New Netherland's eastern border 50 Dutch miles (approximately 250 km) west of the Connecticut's mouth on the mainland and just west of Oyster Bay on Long Island. The Dutch West India Company refused to recognize the treaty, but it failed to reach any other agreement with the English, so the Hartford Treaty set the de facto border. Connecticut mostly assimilated into New England.

Capitulation, restitution, and concession
In March 1664, Charles II of England, Scotland, and Ireland resolved to annex New Netherland and "bring all his Kingdoms under one form of government, both in church and state, and to install the Anglican government as in old England". The directors of the Dutch West India Company concluded that the religious freedom that they offered in New Netherland would dissuade English colonists from working toward their removal. They wrote to Director-General Peter Stuyvesant:

[W]e are in hopes that as the English at the north (in New Netherland) have removed mostly from old England for the causes aforesaid, they will not give us henceforth so much trouble, but prefer to live free under us at peace with their consciences than to risk getting rid of our authority and then falling again under a government from which they had formerly fled.

On 27 August 1664, four English frigates led by Richard Nicolls sailed into New Amsterdam's harbor and demanded New Netherland's surrender. They met no resistance to the capture of New Amsterdam because numerous citizens' requests for protection had gone unheeded by a suitable Dutch garrison against deplorable and tragic massacres by the Indians. That lack of adequate fortification, ammunition, and manpower made New Amsterdam defenseless, and the West India Company had been indifferent to previous pleas for reinforcement of men and ships against "the continual troubles, threats, encroachments and invasions of the English neighbors". Stuyvesant negotiated successfully for good terms from his "too powerful enemies". In the Articles of Surrender of New Netherland, he and his council secured the principle of religious tolerance in Article VIII, which assured that New Netherlanders "shall keep and enjoy the liberty of their consciences in religion" under English rule. The Articles were largely observed in New Amsterdam and the Hudson River Valley, but were violated in another part of the conquest of New Netherland along the Delaware River, where Colonel Sir Robert Carr expropriated property for his own use and sold Dutch prisoners of war into slavery. Nicolls eventually forced Carr to return some of the expropriated property. In addition, a Mennonite settlement led by Pieter Corneliszoon Plockhoy near Lewes, Delaware was destroyed. The 1667 Treaty of Breda ended the Second Anglo-Dutch War; the Dutch did not press their claims on New Netherland, and the status quo was maintained, with the Dutch occupying Suriname and the nutmeg island of Run.

Within six years, the nations were again at war. The Dutch recaptured New Netherland in August 1673 with a fleet of 21 ships led by Vice Admiral Cornelius Evertsen and Commodore Jacob Binckes, then the largest ever seen in America. They chose Anthony Colve as governor and renamed the city New Orange, reflecting the installation of William of Orange as Stadtholder of Holland in 1672; he became King William III of England in 1689. Nevertheless, the Dutch Republic was bankrupt after the conclusion of the Third Anglo-Dutch War in 1672–1674, the historic "disaster years" in which the republic was simultaneously attacked by the French under Louis XIV, the English, the Prince-Bishop of Münster, and Archbishop-Elector of Cologne. The States of Zeeland had tried to convince the States of Holland to take on the responsibility for the New Netherland province, but to no avail. In November 1674, the Treaty of Westminster concluded the war and ceded New Netherland to the English.

Legacy

New Netherland grew into the largest metropolis in the United States, and it left an enduring legacy on American cultural and political life, "a secular broadmindedness and mercantile pragmatism" greatly influenced by the social and political climate in the Dutch Republic at the time, as well as by the character of those who immigrated to it. It was during the early British colonial period that the New Netherlanders actually developed the land and society that had an enduring impact on the Capital District, the Hudson Valley, North Jersey, western Long Island, New York City, Fairfield County, and ultimately the United States.

Political culture
The concept of tolerance was the mainstay of the province's Dutch mother country. The Dutch Republic was a haven for many religious and intellectual refugees fleeing oppression, as well as home to the world's major ports in the newly developing global economy. Concepts of religious freedom and free-trade (including a stock market) were Netherlands imports. In 1682, visiting Virginian William Byrd commented about New Amsterdam that "they have as many sects of religion there as at Amsterdam".

The Dutch Republic was one of the first nation-states of Europe where citizenship and civil liberties were extended to large segments of the population. The framers of the U.S. Constitution were influenced by the Constitution of the Republic of the United Provinces, though that influence was more as an example of things to avoid than of things to imitate.  In addition, the Act of Abjuration, essentially the declaration of independence of the United Provinces from the Spanish throne, is strikingly similar to the later American Declaration of Independence, though there is no concrete evidence that one influenced the other. John Adams went so far as to say that "the origins of the two Republics are so much alike that the history of one seems but a transcript from that of the other."
The Articles of Capitulation (outlining the terms of transfer to the English) in 1664 provided for the right to worship as one wished, and were incorporated into subsequent city, state, and national constitutions in the United States, and are the legal and cultural code that lies at the root of the New York Tri-State traditions.

Many  prominent U.S. citizens are Dutch American directly descended from the Dutch families of New Netherland. The Roosevelt family produced two Presidents and are descended from Claes van Roosevelt, who emigrated around 1650. The Van Buren family of President Martin Van Buren also originated in New Netherland. The Bush family descendants from Flora Sheldon are descendants from the Schuyler family.

External threats
The colony of New Netherland had severe external problems. The population was too small and contentious, and the Company provided little military support. Stuyvesant was usually the loser. The most serious was the economic rivalry with England regarding trade. Secondarily there were small scale military conflicts with neighboring Indian tribes, involving fights between mobile bands on the one hand, and scattered small Dutch outposts on the other. With a large area and limited population, defense was a major challenge. Stuyvesant  greatest success came in  dealing with nearby Swedish colonies, which he defeated and annexed in 1655.  Relations with the English colony of Connecticut were strained, with disputes over ownership of land in the Connecticut valley, and in eastern Long island. The treaty of Hartford of 1650 was advantageous to the English, as Stuyvesant gave up claims to the Connecticut Valley while gaining only a small portion of Long island. In any case Connecticut settlers ignored the treaty and steadily poured into the Hudson Valley, where they agitated against Stuyvesant. In 1664 England moved to take over New Netherland. The Dutch colonists refused to fight, forcing Stuyvesant's surrender, demonstrating the dilemma of domestic dissatisfaction, small size, and overwhelming external pressures with inadequate military support from the Company that was fixated on profits.

Lore

The blue, white, and orange on the flags of New York City, Albany and Jersey City are those of the Prinsenvlag ("Prince's Flag"), introduced in the 17th century as the Statenvlag ("States Flag"), the naval flag of the States General of the Netherlands. The flag and seal of Nassau County depicting the arms of the House of Nassau in the middle. The seven arrows in the lion's claw in the Dutch Republic's coat of arms was a precedent for the thirteen arrows in the eagle's claw in the Great Seal of the United States.

Washington Irving's satirical A History of New York and its famous fictional author Diedrich Knickerbocker had a large impact on the popular view of New Netherland's legacy.  Irving's romantic vision of a Dutch yeomanry dominated the popular imagination about the colony since its publication in 1809. The tradition of Santa Claus is thought to have developed from a gift-giving celebration of the feast of Saint Nicholas on December 5 each year by the settlers of New Netherland. The Dutch Sinterklaas was changed to "Santa Claus", a name first used in the American press in 1773, when Nicholas was used as a symbol of New York's non-British past. However, many of the "traditions" of Santa Claus may have simply been invented by Irving in his 1809 Knickerbocker's History of New York from The Beginning of the World To the End of The Dutch Dynasty.

Language and place names

Dutch continued to be spoken in the region for some time. President Martin Van Buren grew up in Kinderhook, New York speaking only Dutch, becoming the only president not to have spoken English as a first language. A dialect known as Jersey Dutch was spoken in and around rural Bergen and Passaic counties in New Jersey until the early 20th century. Mohawk Dutch was spoken around Albany.

Early settlers and their descendants gave many place names that are still in use throughout the region of New Netherland. They adapted Indian names for locations such as Manhattan, Hackensack, Sing-Sing, and Canarsie. Peekskill, Catskill, and Cresskill all refer to the streams, or kils, around which they grew. Among those that use hoek, meaning corner, are Constable Hook, Kinderhook, Paulus Hook, Red Hook, and Sandy Hook.

See also

New Netherland fortifications
New Netherland settlements
New Holland (Acadia)
New Netherland 1614–1667 – Documentary
New Netherland Project to translate and publish 17th century Dutch documents about the colony
Congregation Shearith Israel, Jewish synagogue founded in the colony in 1655
First Shearith Israel Graveyard, the only remaining 17th century structure in Manhattan.
Dutch American, an inhabitant of the United States of whole or partial Dutch ancestry
Dutch Colonial, an architectural revival movement
Holland Society of New York
List of English words of Dutch origin
List of place names of Dutch origin
Records of the Dutch West India Company at the New York State Archives
Zwaanendael Colony

References

Explanatory notes

Citations

Further reading
 Archdeacon, Thomas J. New York City 1664–1710. Conquest and Change (1976).
 Bachman, V.C. Peltries or Plantations. The Economic Policies of the Dutch West India Company in New Netherland 1633–1639 (1969).
 Balmer, Randall H.  "The Social Roots of Dutch Pietism in the Middle Colonies," Church History Volume: 53. Issue: 2. 1984. pp 187+ online edition
 Barnouw, A.J. "The Settlement of New Netherland," in A.C. Flick ed., History of the State of New York (10 vols., New York 1933), 1:215–258.
 Bruchey, Eleanor. "Stuyvesant, Peter" in  John A. Garraty, ed. Encyclopedia of American Biography (2nd ed. 1996) p. 1065 online 
 Burrows, Edward G. and Michael Wallace. Gotham. A History of New York City to 1898 (1999) pp 14–74.
 Cohen, Ronald D. "The Hartford Treaty of 1650: Anglo-Dutch Cooperation in the Seventeenth Century." New-York Historical Society Quarterly 53#4 (1969): pp 310–332.
 Condon, Thomas J. New York Beginnings. The Commercial Origins of New Netherland (1968) online.
 De Jong, Gerald Francis. "Dominie Johannes Megapolensis: Minister to New Netherland."  New York Historical Society Quarterly (1968) 52#1 pp 6–47; the Dutch Reformed minister 1642 to 1670.
 DeJong, Gerald Francis. "The Formative Years of the Dutch Reformed Church on Long Island," Journal of Long Island History (1968)  8#2 pp 1–16. covers 1636 to 1700.
 Eisenstadt, Peter, ed. Encyclopedia of New York State (Syracuse UP, 2005) pp 1048–1053..
 Fabend, Firth Haring. 2012. New Netherland in a nutshell: a concise history of the Dutch colony in North America. Albany, N.Y.: New Netherland Institute; 139pp
Griffis, William E. The Story of New Netherland. (1909) online
 Jacobs, Jaap. The Colony of New Netherland: A Dutch Settlement in Seventeenth-Century America (2nd ed. Cornell U.P. 2009) 320pp; scholarly history  to 1674 online 1st edition
 Jacobs, Jaap, L. H. Roper, eds. The Worlds of the Seventeenth-Century Hudson Valley. An American Region (State University of New York Press, 2014), 277 pp. specialized essays by scholars. online review
 Kessler, Henry K., and Eugene Rachlis. Peter Stuyvesant and His New York (1959). online
 Krizner, L. J., and Lisa Sita. Peter Stuyvesant: New Amsterdam and the Origins of New York (Rosen, 2000) for middle schools.
  McKinley, Albert E.  "The English and Dutch Towns of New Netherland."  American Historical Review (1900) 6#1 pp 1–18 in JSTOR
 McKinley, Albert E.  "The Transition from Dutch to English Rule in New York: A Study in Political Imitation."  American Historical Review  (1901) 6#4 pp: 693–724. in JSTOR
 Merwick, Donna. Possessing Albany, 1630–1710: The Dutch and English Experiences (1990) excerpt
 Merwick, Donna. The Shame and the Sorrow: Dutch-Amerindian Encounters in New Netherland (2006) 332 pages excerpt
 Merwick, Donna. Stuyvesant Bound: An Essay on Loss Across Time (U of Pennsylvania Press, 2013) 212 pp excerpt
 Shaw Romney, Susanah. "Peter Stuyvesant: Premodern Man" Reviews in American History (2014) 42#4 pp 584–589. review of Merwick.
 Rink, Oliver A. Holland on the Hudson. An Economic and Social History of Dutch New York (Cornell University Press, 1986)
 Scheltema, Gajus and Westerhuijs, Heleen (eds.), Exploring Historic Dutch New York. Museum of the City of New York/Dover Publications, New York (2011). 
 Schmidt, Benjamin, Innocence Abroad: The Dutch Imagination and the New World, 1570–1670, Cambridge: University Press, 2001. 
 Shorto, Russell. The Island at the Center of the World: the epic story of Dutch Manhattan and the forgotten colony that shaped America (New York: Doubleday, 2004).
 Venema, Janny, Beverwijck: a Dutch village on the American frontier, 1652–1664, (Albany: State University of New York Press, 2003).
 Venema, Janny, Kiliaen van Rensselaer (1586–1643): designing a new world. (Albany: State University of New York Press, 2010).
 Woodard, Colin,  American Nations: A History of the Eleven Rival Regional Cultures of North America, Penguin Random House, 2011/2022
 Wright, Langdon G. "Local Government and Central Authority in New Netherland." New York Historical Society Quarterly (1973) 37#1 pp 6–29; covers  1624 to 1663.

Primary sources
Narratives of New Netherland, 1609–1664 (1909), edited by J.F. Jameson, at the Project Gutenberg
 online edition Narratives of New Netherland, 1609–1664 from Google Books
  Van Der Donck, Adriaen. A Description of New Netherland (1655; new ed. 2008) 208 pp. .
 online edition of A Description of New Netherland
 Still, Bayrd, ed. Mirror for Gotham: New York as Seen by Contemporaries from Dutch Days to the Present (1956) online pp 3–14.
 Several primary sources (both translated and in the original Dutch) can be found in Online Publications at the website of the New Netherland Institute. Also included on the NNI site is a comprehensive list of scholarly, nonfiction publications broadly related to the seventeenth-century Dutch colony and its legacy in America.
Google

External links

The Mannahatta Project
Slavery in New York
The New Netherland Museum and the Half Moon
The New Netherland Institute
Dutch Portuguese Colonial History
New Netherland and Beyond
A Brief Outline of the History of New Netherland at the University of Notre Dame
Old New York: Hear Dutch names of New York

 
States and territories established in 1614
States and territories disestablished in 1667
States and territories established in 1673
States and territories disestablished in 1674
1614 establishments in the Dutch Empire
1674 disestablishments in the Thirteen Colonies
1674 disestablishments in the Dutch Empire
17th century in the Dutch Empire
Colonial settlements in North America
Dutch
European colonization of the Americas
History of the Thirteen Colonies
Former colonies in North America
Former Dutch colonies
Former English colonies
Populated places established in the 17th century
Populated places established by the Dutch West India Company
Former settlements and colonies of the Dutch West India Company
Christian states